Michael Palmer (born 1945) is an English philosopher, whose work has been translated into many languages.  His primary field of interest is The Philosophy of Religion.  More recently, however, his work has concentrated on the philosophy of atheism, culminating in his authorship of The Atheist's Creed (2010), The Atheist's Primer (2012) and the projected Atheism for Beginners (due 2013).

Michael Palmer was educated at Lancing College (1958–1963), St John's College, Durham University (1964–67, 70-72), and McMaster University in Canada (1970–71).  His doctorate - on the Theology of Paul Tillich - was supervised at Durham by a Tillich pupil, Professor John Heywood Thomas. After leaving university, Palmer taught for three years at Marlborough College in Wiltshire (1974–77) and it was here that he introduced Philosophy as a Sixth Form subject. 1977 Palmer was the recipient of the prestigious Alexander von Humboldt Fellowship, which enabled him to study at the University of Marburg in Germany.  Here Palmer studied with Professor Carl-Heinz Ratschow - a friend of Tillich's - and it was he who saw to the publication of Palmer's first book, published by De Gruyter of Berlin: Paul Tillich's Philosophy of Art. Palmer's distinction as a Tillich scholar was crowned by his selection as the only English editor of the comprehensive six-volumed edition of Tillich's Main Works, published by de Gruyter in 1990.

On his return to England in 1980 Palmer became the founding Head of the Department of Religion and Philosophy at The Manchester Grammar School, the first Department of its kind in the country. Here Palmer initiated a compulsory Philosophy course for all Sixth Formers.  This course was subsequently published by The Lutterworth Press in 1991 as Moral Problems,  and it remains the most successful School philosophy textbook since the War, still widely in use. Its companion volume,  Moral Problems in Medicine, was published in 1999.

From 1991-1995 Palmer taught at the University of Bristol. Two sets of his lectures - Freud and Jung on Religion (1997)  and The Question of God (2001) - were subsequently published by Routledge. In 2008 The Lutterworth Press published Palmer's two volumed work The Philosophy of Religion. More recently Palmer has become best known for his work on Atheism, and in particular in 2010 for his book The Atheist's Creed. His Credo, which stands at the beginning of this book, has attracted considerable publicity. It reads:-

An adapted edition of The Atheist's Creed, The Atheist's Primer has just been published by The Lutterworth Press (2012).

Another volume on atheism - Atheism for Beginners - is projected for 2013.

Dr Palmer is married with two grown-up children, and lives in Scotland and Italy.

Bibliography

Paul Tillich's Philosophy of Ar't, Berlin, De Gruyter, 1984
Moral Problems, Cambridge, The Lutterworth Press, 1991; second edition, 2005 
Paul Tillich: Main Works/Hauptwerke, Berlin, De Gruyter, 1990
Freud and Jung on Religion, London, Routledge, 1997
Moral Problems in Medicine, Cambridge, The Lutterworth Press, 1999 
The Question of God, London, Routledge, 2001

References

Living people
English philosophers
1945 births
People educated at Lancing College
Alumni of St John's College, Durham